Peter Hugh L'Estrange Wilson (born 17 August 1958) played first-class and List A cricket for Surrey and Somerset in England and for Northern Transvaal in South Africa. He was born at Guildford, Surrey. 

Wilson was educated at Ludgrove School. A tall, strongly-built fast bowler and tail-end batsman, early in his career he was close to Test selection, but problems with his action affected his progress. He holds an odd record, in that he was not dismissed until his 18th first-class match, by which time he had batted seven times and scored 29 runs.

References

External links
 
 Hugh Wilson at CricketArchive

1958 births
Living people
English cricketers
Surrey cricketers
Somerset cricketers
Northerns cricketers
Marylebone Cricket Club cricketers
People educated at Ludgrove School